The Popoyote (Profundulus hildebrandi), also known as the Chiapas killifish, is a killifish from the family Profundulidae which is endemic to the valley of San Cristobal de las Casas in the Chiapas Highlands in Southern Mexico. It is highly endangered because its natural habitat, which amounts to only a few square kilometers, is subject to contamination and urban sprawl from San Cristobal. It is currently being targeted by a civil society alliance for the protection of San Cristobal's wetlands.

The specific name honours the American ichthyologist Samuel F. Hildebrand (1883-1949).

It is marked with numerous vertical bars as a juvenile which disappear in the adult. Spawning begins at the end of February and continues until the onset of the rains in June. During breeding season the adults are greyish in colour with green tones and yellow fins. The popoyote uses the channels and puddles that remain after the rains to lay as many as 150 eggs per female, which hatch after three days. The larvae reach the juvenile stage after three months and in less than one year become adult. Their diet largely consists of the larvae and adults of mosquitoes, although they will also feed on molluscs as well as other insects, such as beetles and dragonflies.

References

Further reading
Caught in the Middle. by Juana de Jesús Pérez Méndez, March 24, 2007

External links
Discover life: Profundulus hildebrandi Miller, 1950

Profundulidae
Fish described in 1950
Endemic fish of Mexico